Teinoletis is a monotypic moth genus of the family Erebidae erected by George Hampson in 1926. Its only species, Teinoletis simoenta, was first described by Achille Guenée in 1852. It is found in Brazil.

References

Calpinae
Monotypic moth genera